Alliance Graphique Internationale (AGI) is a club of the world's leading graphic artists and designers. There are 527 members from 43 countries.  Its members have been collectively responsible for the identity design of most of the world's top corporations and institutions as well as for countless examples of globally known packaging, publications, illustration and posters. Bernard Baissait is the only member who left the AGI following disagreement.

History 
In 1951 two Swiss and three French graphic artists decided to formalise their relationship into a kind of association. In 1952 the Alliance Graphique Internationale was incorporated in Paris with 65 members. The first AGI show was in Paris in 1955. In 1969 the AGI headquarters moved to Zürich.

The organization's most important events are the annual AGI Congress and AGI Open which take place in a different country each year.

Members

Publications 
 AGI- Graphic Design since 1950, by Elly and Ben Bos, Thames & Hudson Publishers 2007, 
 Alliance Graphique International - German Members, Hesign Publisher 2011,

References

External links 
 Official AGI website with members database
 Website AGI Open
 Website AGI Congress

Design institutions
International artist groups and collectives
Arts organizations established in 1952